John G. Diefenbaker High School is a senior public high school located at 6620 4th Street N.W., Huntington Hills, Calgary, Alberta. The school is named after the 13th Prime Minister of Canada, John G. Diefenbaker. The school is part of the Calgary Board of Education. The school graduates around 400 Grade 12 students every year, with a 91% graduation rate. As of September 2021, there are 1574 students.

The school is part of the Action for Bright Children Society.

Academics

John G. Diefenbaker High School is one of the five International Baccalaureate high schools in Calgary. On the Provincial Diplomas, John G. Diefenbaker performs well and is in the top five High Schools in the CBE.

Clubs

Athletics

Diefenbaker is known for their badminton and wrestling programs. John G. Diefenbaker Senior High Schools' wrestling team is among the best in Alberta, having won seven city championships as well as five Provincial titles. Its wrestling team was also the top ranked High School team in Canada in 2007, 2008 & 2009 according to the Canadian National Wrestling Association, having a large number of its members compete and obtain medals at the National Championships. In 2008 they set a Calgary record with 120 points in the city championships. In addition, Diefenbaker has won city championships in girls' rugby, badminton, and in 2011 the girls field hockey took the division 1 city championship against Western Canada beating them 1-0 in overtime.
Diefenbaker was also able to capture the DIV 3 city championship for SR boys volleyball in 2015-2016 and the DIV 3 city championship for SR girls basketball in 2017-2018.

Music program

Diefenbaker High School band program consists of the Concert Band, and Jazz 1 and 2 Bands. Mr. Rod Pauls was the Director of Bands in the school until 2010.  In 2010–2011 school year, Mr. Kenneth Thackrey started as the Director of Bands. His first concert with the school was on November 24, 2010.

The Choir program consists of a Concert Choir, Chamber Choir, and Vocal Jazz. Mr. Laurie Schwartz is the Director of Choirs.

The Music Department holds two annual public concerts: one in the fall and one in the spring.

Notable alumni
Jessie Foster – international endangered missing person and victim of human trafficking. Jessie graduated from JGD in 2002, was lured to the US in 2005 and has been missing since 2006. Jessie is Canada's 'Poster-Child' for this crime.
Chris Gailus – television news anchor
Mike Green – professional ice hockey player, currently playing with the Detroit Red Wings.
Lights (musician) – Canadian musician
Ryan Radmanovich – professional baseball player, played with the Seattle Mariners
Danielle Smith – politician, former leader of the Wildrose Party of Alberta
Jeff Zimmerman – professional baseball player, played with the Texas Rangers and Seattle Mariners, MLB All-Star 1999

References

External links
 The school's website

High schools in Calgary
International Baccalaureate schools in Alberta
John Diefenbaker
Educational institutions established in 1971
1971 establishments in Alberta